Grab is the surname of:

 Alexandru Grab (born 1977), Moldavian footballer
 Hermann Grab (1903–1949), Bohemian writer in the German language
 Michael Grab, Canadian artist specializing in rock balancing, photography and videography
 Sarah Grab (born 1978), Swiss road cyclist

See also
 Detlev Grabs (born 1960), East German retired swimmer